Monkstown is a townland in County Westmeath, Ireland.

Monkstown is one of 11 townlands of the civil parish of Taghmon in the barony of Corkaree in the Province of Leinster.

The neighbouring townlands are: Taghmon and Glebe to the north, Rathcorbally and Downs to the east, Clonkill and Toberaquill to the south, Knockatee to the south–west, Sheefin to the west and Farrancallin to the north–west.

In the 1911 census of Ireland there were 19 houses and 81 inhabitants in the townland.

References

External links
Map of Monkstown at openstreetmap.org
Monkstown at the IreAtlas Townland Data Base
Monkstown at Townlands.ie
Monkstown at The Placenames Database of Ireland

Townlands of County Westmeath